The Japanese paradise flycatcher (Terpsiphone atrocaudata), also called the black paradise flycatcher, is a medium-sized passerine bird native to southeastern Asia. It is a glossy black, chestnut and white bird, slightly smaller than either the Amur paradise flycatcher or Blyth's paradise flycatcher, but similar in appearance. Males have exceptionally long tails. Females are generally duller in appearance and have shorter tails.

It is a migratory species, breeding in Japan, South Korea, Taiwan and the far north of the Philippines. Outside the breeding season it migrates to China, Thailand, Laos, Vietnam, other parts of the Philippines, Malaysia, Singapore, and Sumatra, Indonesia.

Taxonomy and systematics
The Japanese paradise flycatcher was previously classified with the Old World flycatcher family Muscicapidae, but the paradise-flycatchers, monarch flycatchers and  Australasian fantails are now normally grouped with the drongos in the family Dicruridae, which has most of its members in Australasia and tropical southern Asia.

Subspecies
Three subspecies are recognized:
 T. a. atrocaudata - (Eyton, 1839): Found in central and southern Korea, Japan and Taiwan
 T. a. illex - Bangs, 1901: Originally described as a separate species. Found on the Ryukyu Islands
 T. a. periophthalmica - (Ogilvie-Grant, 1895): Originally described as a separate species. Found on Lanyu Island (off of southeast Taiwan) and Batan Island (northern Philippines)

Description
The Japanese paradise flycatcher is similar in appearance to both the Amur paradise flycatcher and Blyth's paradise flycatcher, but is slightly smaller. Mature males have a black hood with a purplish-blue gloss which shades into blackish-grey on the chest. The underparts are off-white to white. The mantle, back, wings and rump are plain dark chestnut. The tail has extremely long black central feathers, which are shorter in immature males. Unlike the Asian paradise flycatcher there is no white morph. The female resembles the male but is duller and darker brown on the chestnut areas. It has black legs and feet, a large black eye with a blue eye-ring, and a short blue bill.

The song is rendered in Japanese as tsuki-hi-hoshi, hoi-hoi-hoi, which translates to Moon-Sun-Stars and gives the Japanese name of the bird サンコウチョウ (三光鳥) sankōchō (literally, bird of three lights, i.e. moon, sun, star, from san three + kō lights + chō bird).

Distribution and habitat
The Japanese paradise flycatcher is mainly migratory and breeds in shady mature deciduous or evergreen broadleaf forest of Japan (southern Honshū, Shikoku, Kyushu and the Nansei Shoto islands), South Korea, Taiwan (including Lanyu island) and the far north Philippines. It is a non-breeding visitor to mainland China, the Russian Far East, Hong Kong, Thailand, Laos, Vietnam, Philippines, Malaysia, Singapore, and Sumatra, Indonesia.

In Jeju-do of South Korea, Gotjawal Forest, a forest formed on a rocky area of volcanic AA Lava, is one of the important breeding sites of Japanese paradise flycatcher

A recent survey detected a steep decline in part of the Japanese breeding population which has presumably occurred because of forest loss and degradation in its winter range.

Notes

References
Brazil, Mark. The Birds of East Asia: China, Taiwan, Korea, Japan, Russia. A & C Black Publishers Ltd., 2009
 Sibagu: Bird Names in Oriental Languages (http://www.sibagu.com/japan/monarchidae.html) (accessed 24 November 2014)

Japanese paradise flycatcher
Birds of Japan
Birds of Korea
Birds of the Ryukyu Islands
Japanese paradise flycatcher
Japanese paradise flycatcher